are a Japanese football club based in Oita City, capital of Oita Prefecture. They currently play in the Kyushu Soccer League, which part of Japanese Regional Leagues. Their main colors, reflected on their crest are blue, white and black.

History
Founded on April 2018, the club quickly won back-to-back promotions alongside league titles from the 3rd to the 1st division of the Oita Prefecture between 2018 and 2020.

In 2021, the club won their first regional-level trophy, after a 4–3 win against Liberty FC gave them the Kyushu Football Championship title. The club would have qualified to the Shakaijin Cup with this win, if the 2021 competition was not cancelled because of COVID-19 extended measures. The club recorded a 3rd place in its Kyushu Soccer League's debut season, only finishing behind Okinawa SV and Veroskronos Tsuno. It is to date their best performance at the league so far, even though just one season was played after it.

In 2022, the club participated in the Oita Prefecture Soccer Championship, which serves as a qualifying tournament for the Emperor's Cup. The club won their matches from the Round of 16 to the semi-finals against SOL FC, Nakatsu FC, and Nippon Bunri University ASC. Onto the final match against Verspah Oita, in which the winner qualified to the Emperor's Cup, COVID-19 struck the team. with multiples players confirmed to be tested positive. The issue did not allow the final to be taking place in the due date. J-Lease thoroughly decided to forfeit the match, giving the Oita Prefecture slot of the competition to their opponent.

In the same year, J-Lease qualified for the first time to the Shakaijin Cup, a cup tournament for teams in any league below the Japan Football League (JFL) that also serves as an alternative way to play in JFL's promotion series. The club qualified via the Kyushu Football Championship, which was a single match against Mitsubishi Heavy Industries Nagasaki. They won the match by 4–0. At their Shakaijin Cup debut, they faced eventual semi-finalists of the Shakaijin Cup, Briobecca Urayasu, who went to join the Japan Football League in the same season. J-Lease lost the match by 2–0, leaving the competition early at the 1st Round.

Ending their season, the club earned a 4th place finish at the Kyushu Soccer League, having at one point won six matches in a row. In only two seasons at Kyushu's elite league, the club have been inside the League's Top 4 in both. Despite not earning a trophy at any competition, the club had high placements in Kyushu competitions and a decent performance against a JFL-tier club in an official competition during the season.

Current squad

Club record

Overall record

Key

Shakaijin Cup record

Honours
League:
Oita Prefecture Soccer League 1st Division (1): 2020
Oita Prefecture Soccer League 2nd Division (1): 2019
Oita Prefecture Soccer League 3rd Division (1): 2018
Cup:
Kyushu Football Championship (2): 2021, 2022
Oita Prefecture Soccer Tournament (1): 2020
Oita FA President's Cup Championship (1): 2018

References

External links
Official Website

Football clubs in Japan
Association football clubs established in 2018
Sports teams in Ōita Prefecture
2018 establishments in Japan